The 1967 European Judo Championships were the 16th edition of the European Judo Championships, and were held in Rome, Italy from 11 to 13 May 1967. Championships were subdivided into six individual competitions, and a separate team competition.

Medal overview

Individual

Teams

Medal table

References 

E
European Judo Championships
European Judo Championships
Sports competitions in Rome
European Judo Championships, 1967
Judo competitions in Italy
European Judo Championships, 1967
European Judo Championships